A cluster-aware application is a software application designed to call cluster APIs in order to determine its running state, in case a manual failover is triggered between cluster nodes for planned technical maintenance, or an automatic failover is required, if a computing cluster node encounters hardware or software failure, to maintain business continuity. A cluster-aware application may be capable of failing over LAN or WAN.

Cluster-aware application characteristics

 Use TCP/IP to maintain heartbeat between nodes.
 Capable of transaction processing.
 Mirroring cluster information in realtime.

See also
Cluster (computing)

References

Cluster computing